St. Bartholomew's Church — referred to by locals as the Old Church (which gave its name to a nearby Ljubljana city bus stop) — is a Catholic filial church and one of the oldest church buildings in Ljubljana, Slovenia.

History
The church was first mentioned in 1370, when representatives of the Doge of Venice and Leopold III and Albert III of Habsburg concluded a peace treaty in front of it on 30 October 1370, in which the Austrians agreed to return the city of Trieste for the compensation of 75,000 florins.

In 1526, its valuables were donated to a fund for improving the city's defenses against Turkish attacks. At the end of the 15th century and beginning of the 16th, it was a venue of Protestant liturgy, but during the Slovene Counter-Reformation in 1618, it was reclaimed as a Roman Catholic church. In 1825, it was damaged by fire and restored several times.

Architecture
Some elements of the original Romanesque church have been preserved, among them the portal on the northern side. Between 1933-36, the church was redesigned according to plans by Jože Plečnik and was in 2009 added on the Slovenian Cultural Heritage List as a cultural monument of national significance under the number 2000.

Events
On the Sunday nearest to St. Bartholomew's Day (24 August) - known as Mosquito Sunday - stalls selling gingerbread, pottery as well as basketry and other wickerwork lined the main road here. Parades and fetes, which attracted hundreds of people, were also once held beside this church.

References

External links

Roman Catholic churches in Ljubljana
14th-century Roman Catholic church buildings in Slovenia
Jože Plečnik buildings
Stone churches